Tata Esteban (born Steve Paolo Regala) (September 28, 1954 - September 10, 2003) was a Filipino producer-director.

Educational life
Esteban had a double major for his undergraduate degree in Business and Hotel and Restaurant Management obtained at the University of Baguio

Filmography

Director

Actor

Writer

Production designer

Producer

Creative consultant

Fight director

Assistant director

Composer

Death
Esteban died on September 10, 2003, from a heart attack.

External links

1954 births
2003 deaths
People from Quezon City
Filipino film producers
Filipino film directors
Filipino writers
University of Baguio alumni
Filipino male film actors